Khanzir is the Arabic word for pig, and is also used in some other languages through borrowing. It is also the individual name given to a famous Chinese pig exhibited at Kabul Zoo in Kabul, Afghanistan. The animal achieved fame as the only pig in Afghanistan, a predominantly Islamic country where the sale of pork is not practiced. As a result, Afghanistan has no pig farms.

Khanzir, a male pig, was given to Kabul Zoo by the People's Republic of China in 2002. He had been one of a pair, but his companion subsequently died.

His status as "Afghanistan's lone pig" attracted international attention in May 2009, when he was moved into quarantine. The move came in response to visitors' concerns at the time of a worldwide outbreak of influenza A (H1N1) ("swine flu"). Aziz Gul Saqib, director of Kabul Zoo, explained that Khanzir was in fact "strong and healthy," noting that "The only reason we moved him was because Afghan people don't have a lot of knowledge about swine flu, and so when they see a pig they get worried and think they will get ill." He was released from quarantine after two months.

See also
 Marjan (lion)
 List of individual pigs

References

Individual pigs
Individual animals in Afghanistan
Afghanistan–China relations